20th Century Blues may refer to:

 Blues, the musical form and genre
 "Twentieth Century Blues", a song from the 1931 musical Cavalcade by Noël Coward
 20th Century Blues (Marianne Faithfull album), 1996
 20th Century Blues (Robin Trower album), 1994
 20th Century Blues, (play by Susan Miller), 2018

See also
 Twentieth-Century Blues: The Songs of Noel Coward, a 1998 Noël Coward tribute album